Tenzin is a Canadian drama film, directed by Michael LeBlanc and Josh Reichmann and released theatrically in Canada in 2023. The film stars Tenzin Kelsang as "Tenzin", a young Tibetan Canadian man who is struggling to come to terms with the death of his older brother by self-immolation at a Tibetan independence movement demonstration.

The film's cast also includes Tenzin Choekyi, Salden Kunga, Yeshi Tenzin, Chemi Lhamo, Norbu Dhundup, Mr. Tibet Sangyal, Ivan Mendez Romero and Tsesang Wangmo. The screenplay was written collaboratively by the directors and the main cast members.

The film premiered in 2021 at the Tallinn Black Nights Film Festival. It had its Canadian premiere at the 2022 Canadian Film Festival, where Kelsang won the award for Best Breakthrough Performance. The film was nominated for Best Costume at the 2023 Canadian Screen Awards.

References

External links

2023 films
Canadian drama films
English-language Canadian films
Tibetan-language films
Films about Asian Canadians
2020s Canadian films